The Tennessee Tribune is an African-American newspaper in Nashville, Tennessee. Its circulation is statewide - Nashville, Chattanooga, Knoxville and Memphis, Tennessee. It was founded in 1991 by Rosetta Irvin Miller-Perry.

Miller-Perry received the Lifetime Achievement Award from the National Newspaper Publishers Association in 2019.

References

African-American newspapers
Mass media in Nashville, Tennessee
Newspapers published in Tennessee
Publications established in 1992
1992 establishments in Tennessee
African-American history in Nashville, Tennessee